Fernwood–Yeadon station (originally Fernwood station) is a SEPTA Regional Rail station in Yeadon, Pennsylvania. It serves the Media/Wawa Line and is located at Church Lane (US 13) and Penn Boulevard. The station saw 113 boardings and 132 alightings on an average weekday. The station originally had a wooden pedestrian bridge and a grade crossing.

Fernwood-Yeadon station is east of the terminus of the former Newtown Square Branch and the Cardington Branch of the Pennsylvania Railroad. 1.5 miles from the station is the Yeadon Loop, which is the terminus for the Route 13 trolley of the SEPTA Subway-Surface Trolley Lines. Two bus routes (68 and 108) connecting to this station intersect with the Route 13 line.

Station layout
Fernwood–Yeadon has two low-level side platforms.

References

External links
SEPTA – Fernwood-Yeadon Station
Original Fernwood PRR Station
Philadelphia Terminal Division Map (Pennsylvania Railroad Historical Society) 

SEPTA Regional Rail stations
Stations on the West Chester Line
Railway stations in Delaware County, Pennsylvania